Nematanthus gregarius, the clog plant or goldfish plant, is a species of flowering plant in the family Gesneriaceae, native to Brazil.

The flowers vaguely resemble clogs in shape and goldfish in colour, hence the common names.

As it does not tolerate temperatures below , in temperate zones this plant requires the protection of glass. It is often seen as a houseplant, in hanging baskets which highlight its trailing habit.

Nematanthus gregarius has received the Royal Horticultural Society's Award of Garden Merit.

References 
 
 

Flora of Brazil
Endemic flora of Brazil
Gesnerioideae